Rocky Hill is an unincorporated community in Tulare County, California. It lies at an elevation of 1549 feet (472 m).

References

Geography of Visalia, California
Unincorporated communities in Tulare County, California
Unincorporated communities in California